Francisco Manuel García Flores (born 8 October 2003) is a Mexican professional footballer who plays as a forward for Liga MX club América.

Career statistics

Club

Notes

References

External links
 
 
 

Living people
2003 births
Association football forwards
Mexican footballers
Liga MX players
Club América footballers
Footballers from Baja California
Sportspeople from Tijuana